
Busko is a unit of territorial administration and local government (powiat) in Świętokrzyskie Voivodeship, south-central Poland. It came into being on January 1, 1999, as a result of the Polish local government reforms passed in 1998.

As of 2019 its total population is 67,821, out of which the population of Busko-Zdrój is 15,832and the rural population is 51,989.

Neighbouring counties
Busko County is bordered by Kielce County to the north, Staszów County to the east, Dąbrowa County to the south, Kazimierza County to the south-west and Pińczów County to the west.

Administrative division
The county is subdivided into eight gminas (one urban-rural and seven rural). These are listed in the following table, in descending order of population.

References

 
Busko